Torre de Vilela is a former civil parish in the municipality of Coimbra, Portugal. The population in 2011 was 1,242, in an area of 4.44 km2. It was annexed to Brasfemes until 1876, at which point it became an independent freguesia. On 28 January 2013 it merged with Trouxemil to form Trouxemil e Torre de Vilela.

References 

Former parishes of Coimbra